Courtet is a French surname. Notable people with the surname include:

Émile Cohl (1857–1938), French caricaturist, cartoonist, and animator
Gaëtan Courtet (born 1989), French footballer
Guillaume Courtet (1589–1637), French Dominican priest

French-language surnames